Vladimir Loshchilov (29 April 1932 – 15 August 1999) was a Soviet athlete. He competed in the men's shot put at the 1956 Summer Olympics.

References

1932 births
1999 deaths
Athletes (track and field) at the 1956 Summer Olympics
Soviet male shot putters
Olympic athletes of the Soviet Union
Place of birth missing